Sir Keith Charles Owen "Mick" Shann  (22 November 1917 – 4 August 1988) was a senior Australian public servant and diplomat.

Life and career
Mick Shann was born in the Melbourne suburb of Kew, Victoria, on 22 November 1917. His father was Frank Shann, a respected teacher and headmaster. He studied arts at the University of Melbourne, where he was in residence at Trinity College from 1936 to 1936, winning the Alcock Scholarship.

Shann's first Commonwealth Public Service positions were at the Bureau of Census and Statistics in 1939 and the Department of Labour and National Service from 1940 to 1946. In 1946, he moved to the Department of External Affairs in Canberra to take up an appointment as second secretary of the United Nations Division in the department.

In 1955, Shann was appointed Minister to the Philippines.

From 1962 to 1966 Shann was Australian Ambassador to Indonesia, during the time of the Indonesia–Malaysia confrontation. Shann perceived "clouds of mistrust" preventing close ties between the neighbouring countries at the time, suggesting that Indonesians were "puzzled at Australia being a European outcrop on the edge of Asia", but that Australia had no reason to fear Indonesia.

In 1970, Shann was appointed a Deputy Secretary in the Department of External Affairs, shortly before it was renamed the Department of Foreign Affairs. In this role until 1973, he worked alongside Departmental secretary Keith Waller to raise the department's reputation and morale. During his time in the Deputy Secretary role, he insisted that the department's staff should go back on regular Public Service classifications and salary levels and the formal separation between diplomatic and administrative foreign affairs staff should be abolished.

Shann was appointed Australian Ambassador to Japan in 1973. From Japan, he was appointed chairman of the Public Service Board, commencing in the role from 28 March 1977. After 17 months as board chairman, Shann resigned from the Public Service at age 60, citing personal and family reasons.

Shann died on 4 August 1988, at 70 years of age.

Awards and honours
Shann was made a Commander of the Order of the British Empire in January 1964 while he was Ambassador in Jakarta. He was appointed a Knight Bachelor in June 1980.

In 2012, a street in the Canberra suburb of Casey was named Mick Shann Terrace in Shann's honour.

References

1917 births
1988 deaths
People educated at Trinity College (University of Melbourne)
Ambassadors of Australia to Japan
Australian Commanders of the Order of the British Empire
Australian Knights Bachelor
Ambassadors of Australia to Indonesia
Ambassadors of Australia to the Philippines
Public servants from Melbourne
People from Kew, Victoria